At Basin Street East is a 1961 live album by Billy Eckstine, accompanied by a big band arranged and conducted by Quincy Jones. It was originally released on October 1, 1961, on the EmArcy label, but reissued in 1990 by Polygram. The album was recorded at the Basin Street East nightclub in New York City.

Track listing 
 "Alright, Okay, You Win" (Sidney Wyche, Mayme Watts)
 Medley: "I'm Falling for You"/"Fool That I Am"/"Everything I Have Is Yours" (Burton Lane, George Sanders, Jr., Clarence Williams, Floyd Hunt, Harold Adamson)  
 "In the Still of the Night" (Cole Porter)  
 Duke Ellington medley: "Don't Get Around Much Anymore"/"I'm Just a Lucky So-and-So" (Irving Mills, Duke Ellington, Mitchell Parish, Bob Russell, Juan Tizol, Mack David)  
 "Work Song" (Nat Adderley, Oscar Brown, Jr.)
 "Ma (She's Making Eyes at Me)" (Con Conrad, Sidney Clare)

Personnel 
 Billy Eckstine - vocals
 Quincy Jones - bandleader

References

External links 
 [ Allmusic review]

1961 live albums
Albums arranged by Quincy Jones
Albums conducted by Quincy Jones
Albums recorded at Basin Street East
Billy Eckstine albums
EmArcy Records live albums